Adeniyi Sulaimon Gbadegesin, born 13 February 1958, is an Academician and was Vice chancellor of the Ladoke Akintola University of Technology, LAUTECH at Ogbomosho between 2011-2018

Education
Adeniyi got his bachelor in science in geography (1979) and also did his masters in geography (1981), He got his doctorate degree (1984) at University of Ibadan.

Career
Adeniyi started his academic career as an assistant lecturer (1983) and got promoted to the post of lecturer II (1984) before becoming lecturer I (1988) and senior lecturer (1991). He became a reader (1996) and a professor (1999). He did all these in the department of Geography.

Affiliations
He is affiliated to professional bodies which includes; Vice president of Association of Nigeria Geographers; Member of the society for International development, Ibadan; member of Ibadan socio-economic group.

Awards
Adeniyi has gotten awards which include  Nigeria's cocoa marketing board scholarship award between 1997 and 1979.

References 

1958 births
Living people
Academic staff of Ladoke Akintola University of Technology
University of Ibadan alumni
Vice-Chancellors of Nigerian universities
Nigerian geographers